In the investment management industry, a separately managed account (SMA) is any of several different types of investment accounts.  For example, an SMA may be an individual managed investment account; these are often offered by a brokerage firm through one of their brokers or financial consultants and managed by independent investment management firms (often called money managers for short); they have varying fee structures.  These particular types of SMAs may be called "wrap fee" or "dual contract" accounts, depending on their structure. There is no official designation for the SMA, but there are common characteristics that are represented in many types of SMA programs. These characteristics include an open structure or flexible investment security choices; multiple money managers; and a customized investment portfolio formulated for a client's specific investment objectives or desired restrictions.

Description and history
The term "SMA" is used mostly in the U.S. brokerage industry for these types of arrangements whereby an account is managed by portfolio management resources within the firm, or more commonly, by an outside money management (investment advisory) firm along with an administrator. In this context, an SMA can be thought of as an investment vehicle similar to a mutual fund, in which the customer pays a fee to a money manager for its services managing the customer's investment. The important difference is that a mutual fund investor owns shares of a company that in turn owns other investments, whereas an SMA investor owns the invested assets directly in his own name.  SMAs must abide by a number of requirements, set forth in Rule 3a-4 under the Investment Company Act of 1940, to ensure they are not deemed to be unregistered investment companies. 

A similar type of account or arrangement is termed a "separately managed account", "separate account", or "private account" when opened directly with investment management firms, which are not brokerage firms.  The term "separate account" in this context should not be confused with separate account of an insurance company.

SMAs were developed in the 1970s to accommodate accounts and clients who needed to meet specific objectives that did not fit within the constrictions of a mutual fund investment. It is the freedom of choice of professional managers, portfolio customization, objective investment advice for a set fee, diversification (or concentration should the client choose), tax efficiency and general flexibility that have made SMAs popular among informed investors.

The ownership structure of an SMA provides an investor some tax advantages over a similarly-invested mutual fund. After purchasing mutual fund shares, an investor will have a tax liability for any net capital gains in the mutual fund portfolio, even if the investments the fund sold for a gain were purchased before the investor owned the shares of the fund. This is known as an "unearned capital gain," and has a negative effect on the investor's return from his mutual fund investment. However, because assets in an SMA are owned by the investor directly, unearned capital gains are not possible. Further, an investor in an SMA typically has the ability to direct the investment manager to sell individual securities with the objective of raising capital gains or losses for tax planning purposes. This practice is known as "tax harvesting", and its objective is to attempt to equalize capital gains and losses across all of the investor's accounts for a given year in order to reduce capital gains taxes owed.

SMAs are popular with wealthier investors and their financial advisers as they are seen as exclusive, and offer investment options not available to those of more modest means.  According to the State of the Financial Advisory Industry: 2008 report, SMAs are popular picks among advisers at national broker/dealers and wealth managers.  Advisers at national broker/dealers and wealth managers (defined as any financial adviser with a client asset minimum of $2 million or above) made much more aggressive allocations to SMAs than the average. The national broker/dealers allocated 29 percent to separately managed accounts, with 17 percent to mutual funds; wealth managers allocated 18 percent to separately managed accounts and 28 percent to mutual funds.  

The financial scandals and market declines that occurred in 2008 have served as a catalyst for hedge fund investors to migrate towards SMAs. As such, the SMA is evolving to accommodate expected investor demand into such structures. The unified managed account is an example of an improvement on the SMA structure as it links multiple managers and strategies to a single investor-controlled account. The configuration of the unified managed account allows whatever blend of managers selected by the investor to be more capital and operationally efficient than had the same blend been structured within an SMA or within a fund structure.

Performance

The Wall Street Journal reported that separately managed accounts performed much better than mutual funds in 2008, a year when the global stock market lost US$21 trillion in value.

Morningstar, Inc. found that SMAs outperformed mutual funds in 25 of 36 stock and bond market categories for not only 2008, but also 2006 and 2007. The Wall Street Journal cited top SMA performers including Robinson Value Management Ltd’s Market Opportunity Composite Strategy, and PTI Securities & Futures LP’s Protected Index Program.  
  The Wall Street Journal added that SMAs work best for investors with at least $1 million or $2 million to spread among various SMA strategies.  The story said that, "One reason SMAs may be outperforming mutual funds is that individual SMA strategies tend to have smaller amounts of assets than popular mutual funds, allowing them to trade more nimbly."

Pensions & Investments, a national US investment trade magazine, identified several of the top performing SMAs for 2008.

References

Investment management